The Canary Islands Independence Movement (CIIM), also known as the Movement for the Independence and Self-determination of the Canaries Archipelago (MPAIAC), was an independentist organization that had a radio station in Algiers and resorted to violence in attempts to force the Spanish government to create an independent state in the Canary Islands.

History
The Canary Islands Independence Movement was started by Antonio Cubillo in 1964. Based in Algeria, the MPAIAC was recognized in 1968 by the Organisation of African Unity. Its armed struggle was carried out by the group's armed wing, the Fuerzas Armadas Guanches (FAG), which in 1976 bombed a mall in Las Palmas de Gran Canaria. In 1978 Antonio Cubillo was the victim of an attempt against his life in Algiers, organized by the Spanish secret services, as a result of which he became disabled.

The CIIM's radio programmes called for the Canarian people to "go back to their roots" and tried to popularize the Berber language. But its efforts were mostly unsuccessful because Canarios were averse to the violent methods of the movement and at its height the CIIM had no more than 100 members. The flag of the movement became very popular, however, and was adopted without the stars for the pre-autonomous government.

In 1979 the CIIM (MPAIAC) made a formal declaration renouncing the "armed struggle".

The CIIM or MPAIAC ceased activity after the Spanish government created the Autonomous Community of the Canaries Archipelago in 1982. A royal pardon was granted to Antonio Cubillo and he returned to Spain.

The political wing of MPAIAC was known as Canarian Workers Party, Partido de los Trabajadores Canarios (PTC). It did not manage to rule any municipality in the islands before disbanding. Other pro-independence organizations that have succeeded MPAIAC, such as the Popular Front of the Canary Islands (FREPIC), have remained largely marginal.

Violent acts
As part of its self-declared armed struggle CIIM bombed the offices of South African Airways in Las Palmas on 3 January 1977, its first attack.

CIIM terrorists bombed a florist shop in Las Palmas Airport on 27 March 1977, injuring eight people. Members then threatened to explode a second bomb in the airport, forcing police to shut down air traffic while they searched for the bomb. Antonio Cubillo, secretary general of the movement, denied responsibility for the accident, saying "[t]hat was the fault of the control tower at Las Palmas. We had nothing to do with it." He also noted that the group had warned tourists to stay away from the Canaries.

See also
 Canarian nationalism
 National Congress of the Canaries (CNC)
 Popular Front of the Canary Islands (Frepic-Awañak)
 Fuerzas Armadas Guanches
 List of active separatist movements in Africa
 Tenerife airport disaster, indirectly caused by the group.

References

Anti-Francoism
Canarian nationalist parties
Terrorism in Algeria
Terrorism in Spain
History of the Canary Islands
National liberation movements
Left-wing militant groups in Spain
Left-wing nationalist parties
Defunct organizations designated as terrorist in Africa
Defunct nationalist parties in Spain
Defunct socialist parties in Spain